Disturbing the Peace is the second studio album by the American heavy metal band Alcatrazz, and is the only one featuring Steve Vai on guitar. The album remained for 7 weeks on the Billboard 200 albums chart, peaking at No. 145.

The album was re-released in 2001 as Vol.02 of Steve Vai's The Secret Jewel Box and as a remastered, expanded version with a different cover in 2013 on Polish label Metal Mind.

Track listing
All songs by Graham Bonnet and Steve Vai, except where noted.

Side one
"God Blessed Video" - 3:30
"Mercy" (Bonnet, Vai, Jimmy Waldo, Gary Shea, Jan Uvena) - 4:22
"Will You Be Home Tonight" (Bonnet, Vai, Waldo) - 5:03
"Wire and Wood" - 3:29
"Desert Diamond" - 4:20

Side two
"Stripper" - 3:52
"Painted Lover" - 3:23
"Lighter Shade of Green" [instrumental] (Vai) - 0:46 
"Sons and Lovers" - 3:37
"Skyfire" - 3:54
"Breaking the Heart of the City" - 4:59

2011 Expanded Edition Disc 2, previously unreleased live album
Recorded October 10, 1984, at Shinjuku Koseinenkin Kaikan, Tokyo, Japan
"Opening" - 2:08
"Breaking the Heart of the City" - 6:18
"Jet to Jet" - 4:38
"Skyfire" - 3:54
"Sons and Lovers" - 3:03
"Hiroshima Mon Amour" - 3:52
"God Blessed Video" - 4:58
"Will You Be Home Tonight" - 5:07
"Kree Nakoorie" - 9:09
"Since You've Been Gone" - 3:20
"Painted Lover" - 3:40
"Suffer Me" - 6:08
"Stripper" - 3:56
"Too Young to Die, Too Drunk to Live" - 4:46
"Koujou No Tsuki (The Moon over the Lake)" - 2:01
"Night Games" - 3:04
"All Night Long" - 8:55

Personnel
Alcatrazz
Graham Bonnet – vocals, backing vocals
Steve Vai – guitar, backing vocals
Jimmy Waldo – keyboards, backing vocals, keytar on "God Blessed Video" (live)
Gary Shea – bass 
Jan Uvena – drums, backing vocals

Production
Eddie Kramer – producer, engineer, mixing at Cherokee Studios
John Begoshian Paul Levy – engineers, mixing
Brian Leshon, Brian Scheuble, Mark Wilczak, Paul Lani, Ross Stien – assistant engineers
George Marino – mastering at Sterling Sound, New York
Ron Slenzak – photography
Andrew Trueman – management

References

1985 albums
Albums produced by Eddie Kramer
Capitol Records albums
Alcatrazz albums